Roseller Lim, officially the Municipality of Roseller Lim (Chavacano: Municipalidad de Roseller Lim), is a 3rd class municipality in the province of Zamboanga Sibugay, Philippines. According to the 2020 census, it has a population of 43,575 people.

The town is named in honor of the first Senator from Zamboanga, Senator Roseller T. Lim.

Geography

Barangays
Roseller Lim is politically subdivided into 26 barangays.

Climate

Demographics

Religion
Catholic
Baptist
Islam
Iglesia ni Cristo
Alliance Church
Grace Gospel Church of Christ
New Hope
The Bishop of the Dumaguete City Christian Fellowship Churches of the Philippines
Members Church of God International (Ang Dating Daan)

Economy

Government

List of former chief executives
 Romeo Billote
 Camilo Bicoy
 Danilo "Dan" Piodena
 Michael "Papong" Piodena - present

Education 
Roseller Lim has many elementary and high schools, as well as colleges.

Elementary

Secondary 
 Surabay National High School (SNHS)
 Malubal National High school (MNHS)
 Santo Rosario National High school (SrNHS)
 San Fernandino National High School (SFNHS)
 Guinabucan National High School (GNHS)
 Gango National High School (GNHS)

Tertiary 
 Western Sibugay College (WESCO)
 Western Mindanao Cooperative College-Annex (WMCC)

Tourism
 Arka sa RTLim
 bamboo cottages located at Sitio Talisay, Barangay Gango, R.T.Lim ARCILLAS BEACH

References

External links 
 Roseller Lim Profile at PhilAtlas.com
 [ Philippine Standard Geographic Code]
Philippine Census Information

Municipalities of Zamboanga Sibugay